Langebakkersoord is a former municipality in the Dutch province of South Holland. It was located northwest of Hoogvliet, on the confluence of the Oude Maas and Nieuwe Maas rivers.

Langebakkersoord was a separate municipality between 1817 and 1826, when it merged with Pernis.

References

Former municipalities of South Holland